The men's 100 metres event at the 1994 Commonwealth Games was held on 22 and 23 August at the Centennial Stadium in Victoria, British Columbia.

Medalists

Results

Heats
Wind:Heat 1: +1.8 m/s, Heat 2: +1.5 m/s, Heat 3: +0.6 m/s, Heat 4: +1.3 m/s, Heat 5: +1.3 m/s, Heat 6: +2.1 m/s, Heat 7: +2.0 m/s, Heat 8: +1.5 m/s

Quarterfinals
Wind:Heat 1: +0.2 m/s, Heat 2: +0.4 m/s, Heat 3: +1.8 m/s, Heat 4: +1.1 m/s

Semifinals
Wind:Heat 1: +1.8 m/s, Heat 2: +2.3 m/s

Final
Wind: +1.9 m/s

References

100
1994